Pierre Forgues (born 17 June 1938, in Tarbes) is a member of the National Assembly of France.  He represents the Hautes-Pyrénées department,  and is a member of the Socialiste, radical, citoyen et divers gauche.

References

1938 births
Living people
People from Tarbes
Socialist Party (France) politicians
Deputies of the 12th National Assembly of the French Fifth Republic
Deputies of the 13th National Assembly of the French Fifth Republic